Black Horse Canyon is a 1954 American Western film directed by Jesse Hibbs and written by Daniel Mainwaring and David Lang. It is based on the 1950 novel The Wild Horse by Les Savage Jr.. The film stars Joel McCrea, Mari Blanchard, Race Gentry, Murvyn Vye, Irving Bacon and John Pickard. The film was released in June 1954, by Universal Pictures.

Plot

Cast        
Joel McCrea as Del "Rock" Rockwell
Mari Blanchard as Aldis Spain
Race Gentry as Ti Taylor
Murvyn Vye as Jennings
Irving Bacon as Doc
John Pickard as Duke
Ewing Mitchell as Sheriff
Pilar Del Rey as Juanita

References

External links
 

1954 films
American Western (genre) films
1954 Western (genre) films
Universal Pictures films
Films directed by Jesse Hibbs
1950s English-language films
1950s American films